The four-striped emo skink  (Emoia tetrataenia) is a species of lizard in the family Scincidae. It is found in Papua New Guinea and Indonesia.

References

Emoia
Reptiles described in 1895
Reptiles of Papua New Guinea
Reptiles of Indonesia
Taxa named by George Albert Boulenger
Skinks of New Guinea